Bruceville-Eddy Independent School District is a public school district based in Bruceville-Eddy, Texas (USA).

Located in southern McLennan County, portions of the district extend into Falls and Bell counties.

Bruceville-Eddy High School was a 2005 National Blue Ribbon School.

In 2009, the school district was rated "academically acceptable" by the Texas Education Agency.

Schools 
 Bruceville-Eddy High School
 Junior High School
 Intermediate School
 Elementary School

References

External links 
Bruceville-Eddy ISD

School districts in McLennan County, Texas
School districts in Falls County, Texas
School districts in Bell County, Texas